Daniela Meuli (born 6 November 1981) is a Swiss snowboarder. Meuli is World Champion 2005 in parallel slalom. In the World Cup in Parallel Giant Slalom, she ranked 1st for 2003/2004, 2004/2005 and the current season (as of 11 February 2006). She also competed at the 2002 Winter Olympics and the 2006 Winter Olympics, winning a gold medal at the latter.

References

External links
 Daniela-Meuli.ch
 

1981 births
Living people
Swiss female snowboarders
Olympic snowboarders of Switzerland
Snowboarders at the 2002 Winter Olympics
Snowboarders at the 2006 Winter Olympics
Olympic gold medalists for Switzerland
Olympic medalists in snowboarding
Medalists at the 2006 Winter Olympics
Universiade medalists in snowboarding
Universiade bronze medalists for Switzerland
Competitors at the 2007 Winter Universiade
21st-century Swiss women